Alhaji Mogtari Sahanun is a Ghanaian politician and a former ambassador to Burkina Faso. From 1992 until 2002 Sahanun served as the Upper West regional secretary. From 2001 to 2005, he rose as the regional minister. From 2006 to 2009 Sahanun was the ambassador to Burkina Faso. He is currently contesting for vice-chairmanship of the New Patriotic Party.

References

Ghanaian Ahmadis
Living people
Ambassadors of Ghana to Burkina Faso
New Patriotic Party politicians
Year of birth missing (living people)